This is an overview of the results achieved by Somerset County Cricket Club since their admission to first-class cricket in 1882.

Key

Pre County Championship (1882-1885)

County Championship (1891–present)

Bob Willis Trophy (2020)

One-day trophy (1963-present)

One-day league (1969-2009)

Benson & Hedges Cup (1972-2002)

Twenty20 Cup (2003-present)

References
General

Specific

Seasons
Seasons, Somerset County Cricket Club
Cricket seasons